Saint Hesychius or Isicius (died  565) was a bishop of Vienne from about 545 to his death. He is venerated as a saint in the Catholic church.

Life 
According to the historian Bernard Bligny (1979), Hesychius belonged to "one of the principal Gallo-Roman families of 'Bourgogne', the Hesychii, a branch of the Syagrii", of whom several members were bishops of either Vienne and Grenoble.

Archbishop Leger of Vienne recorded in his Liber Episcopalis Viennensis Ecclesiae (1060) that Hesychius took part in the Fifth Council of Orléans in 549 (noted as "Eutychius") and in the Council of Paris in 552.

He is believed to have died in about 565. He was buried by his sister Marcellina near the tomb of Saint Avitus. According to his epitaph he had been a quaestor before being elected bishop.

Cultus 
Hesychius' cultus as a saint was attested in the 15th-century calendar of Vienne and was confirmed by Pope Pius X by decree dated 9 December 1903.

His eulogy is in the Roman Martyrology for 12 November, his feast day. He is also celebrated together with Saint Martin and all the bishop saints of Vienne on 1 July.

See also
Hesychius I (bishop of Vienne)

References

Sources 

 Il martirologio romano. Riformato a norma dei decreti del Concilio ecumenico Vaticano II e promulgato da papa Giovanni Paolo II, LEV, Città del Vaticano 2004
 Congregatio de Causis Sanctorum, Index ac status causarum, Città del Vaticano 1999
 Filippo Caraffa and Giuseppe Morelli (eds.), Bibliotheca Sanctorum (BSS), 12 vols., Istituto Giovanni XXIII nella Pontificia Università Lateranense, Roma 1961-1969

Bishops of Vienne
Year of birth unknown
565 deaths
Gallo-Roman saints
6th-century Christian saints